The selection process for the 1928 Winter Olympics consisted of three bids, all from Switzerland, and saw St. Moritz be selected ahead of Davos and Engelberg. The selection was made at the 24th IOC Session in Lisbon, Portugal, on 6 May 1926.

References

Bids
 
May 1926 events
Events in Lisbon
1926 in Portugal
1920s in Lisbon